Paraparaumu is a town in the south-western North Island of New Zealand.

Like other towns in the area, it has a partner settlement at the coast called Paraparaumu Beach, which lies directly opposite Kapiti Island. The two towns form part of the Kapiti Coast District. Together with the nearby Raumati Beach and Raumati South they are among the fastest-growing urban areas in New Zealand, and are major dormitory towns with workers commuting to the cities that make up the Wellington urban area. The four towns between them have a 2012 population of over 49,000 people. Inland behind Paraparaumu is the Maungakotukutuku area.

Paraparaumu is a Māori-language name meaning "scraps from an earth oven";  means "dirt" or "scraps", and  means "oven".

The village of Lindale is a located just north of the Paraparaumu town centre. It began as a Tourist and Agricultural Centre, but later gained a reputation for cheese and the Lindale Barnyard petting farm.

The old State Highway 1 and the North Island Main Trunk railway both pass through Lindale.  The railway line was formerly owned by the Wellington and Manawatu Railway Company, and construction of the line was completed when the ends from Wellington and Longburn (Palmerston North) met near Lindale in Otaihanga in 1886. There are proposals to extend the commuter train service, operated by Transdev Wellington to a new station at Lindale, subject to Wellington Regional Council funding.

The majority of shops are located close to the town centre in Coastlands Mall, and the train station being close as well. The area hosts many important places and roads in Paraparaumu Beach.

Climate

Paraparaumu has an oceanic climate typical of New Zealand, with moderately warm summers and mild winters. It has a quite high rainfall frequency year round, although it is drier than many other coastal areas in the country.

Demographics 

Paraparaumu had a population of 28,701 at the 2018 New Zealand census, an increase of 1,866 people (7.0%) since the 2013 census, and an increase of 3,441 people (13.6%) since the 2006 census. There were 11,379 households. There were 13,560 males and 15,138 females, giving a sex ratio of 0.9 males per female, with 5,199 people (18.1%) aged under 15 years, 4,302 (15.0%) aged 15 to 29, 12,489 (43.5%) aged 30 to 64, and 6,708 (23.4%) aged 65 or older.

Ethnicities were 89.1% European/Pākehā, 12.5% Māori, 3.1% Pacific peoples, 5.1% Asian, and 2.3% other ethnicities (totals add to more than 100% since people could identify with multiple ethnicities).

The proportion of people born overseas was 23.5%, compared with 27.1% nationally.

Although some people objected to giving their religion, 54.0% had no religion, 34.7% were Christian, 0.7% were Hindu, 0.1% were Muslim, 0.6% were Buddhist and 2.6% had other religions.

Of those at least 15 years old, 5,013 (21.3%) people had a bachelor or higher degree, and 3,876 (16.5%) people had no formal qualifications. The employment status of those at least 15 was that 10,368 (44.1%) people were employed full-time, 3,333 (14.2%) were part-time, and 918 (3.9%) were unemployed.

Economy

Retail

Coastlands Shopping Town opened in Paraparaumu in 1969. It has 1400 carparks and 94 shops, including Pak'nSave, The Warehouse, Farmers and Countdown.

Sport

Paraparaumu was formerly represented in soccer/footballl by Paraparaumu United.  They merged with the Raumati Hearts in 2003 to create Kapiti Coast United, which is based at Weka Park in Raumati.

The local athletics club is Paraparaumu Track and Field Club, which has both junior and senior members in conjunction with Athletics Wellington and Athletics New Zealand age grades. The club is based at the Paraparaumu Domain.

Paraparaumu Beach also has a golf course.  It has hosted the New Zealand Open a total of 12 times, a record unsurpassed by any other course.

Transport

Airport 
Kapiti Coast Airport has a few scheduled commercial flights and is a popular recreational airfield, hosting the Kapiti Aero Club. Air Chathams will have daily flights between the airport and Auckland from 20 August 2018, and Sounds Air operate to Blenheim and Nelson. Now defunct, locally based Air2there used operate to Blenheim and Nelson also. Prior to the mid 2010s Air New Zealand used to have scheduled services to Kapiti Coast Airport with their ATR-42s and Q-400/ DHC-8s. This was then cancelled in the mid 2010s.

Public transport 

Paraparaumu is located on the North Island Main Trunk Railway (NIMT), on the Kapiti Line of Wellington's commuter railway network operated by Transdev under the Metlink brand. Electrified commuter services were extended to Waikanae on 20 February 2011. Korean built by Hyundai Rotem, FP/FT class electric multiple units operate the commuter trains.

Beyond Waikanae, KiwiRail's Tranz Scenic operates a diesel-hauled long distance passenger service: the Capital Connection between Palmerston North and Wellington. The Northern Explorer between Auckland and Wellington stopped in Paraparaumu to onboard scheduled passenger until it was discontinued in December 2021. 

There are also feeder and local commuter bus services.

Education

Primary schools

Paraparaumu School is a co-educational state primary school for Year 1 to 8 Students with a roll of 350. 

Paraparaumu Beach School is a co-educational state primary school for Year 1 to 8 Students with a roll of 586 students as of November 2022.

Kenakena School is a co-educational state primary school for Year 1 to 8 students, with a roll of 500.

Secondary schools

Three secondary schools are located near the Paraparaumu township: Paraparaumu College in Paraparaumu Beach, Kapiti College in Raumati Beach and Otaki College in Ōtaki.

Notable residents

Born in Paraparaumu

 Christian Cullen – rugby union footballer

 Stephen Kearney – rugby league footballer and coach
 Wayne McIndoe – field hockey player
 Drew Ne'emia  – former television presenter
 Andrew Niccol – film director

Educated in Paraparaumu

 Peter Jackson at Kapiti College – film director

 Dane Coles at Paraparaumu College - All Blacks player
 Karl Kippenberger at Kapiti College - bass player in Shihad

Notes

 
Populated places in the Wellington Region
Kapiti Coast District